Robert Mayer may refer to:
 Robert Mayer (ice hockey) (born 1989), Swiss ice hockey goaltender
 Robert Mayer (philanthropist) (1879–1985), German-born British philanthropist
 Robert Mayer (politician) (born 1957), president pro tem of the Missouri Senate
 Robert A. Mayer (1933–2008), director of George Eastman House
 Robert Mayer (journalist), author of the novel Superfolks (1977)
 Bob Mayer (author) (born 1959)
 Julius Robert von Mayer (1814–1878), German physician and physicist, and one of the founders of thermodynamics

See also
 Robert Mayer – der Arzt aus Heilbronn, a 1955 East German film
 Haldane Robert Mayer (born 1941), Senior United States Circuit Judge of the United States Court of Appeals for the Federal Circuit